Archigraptis rosei is a species of moth of the family Tortricidae. It is found in Brunei.

References

Moths described in 1988
Tortricini
Moths of Asia